Venizelou (literally Venizelos [Street]) is an under-construction metro station serving Thessaloniki Metro's Line 1 and Line 2. The station is named after Eleftherios Venizelos, Liberal Prime Minister of Greece. It is expected to enter service in 2023. Construction of this station has been held back by major archaeological finds, and it is designated as a high-importance archaeological site by Attiko Metro, the company overseeing its construction.

The discovery was so major that it delayed the entire Metro project for years. A historian dubbed the discovery "the Byzantine Pompeii". Attiko Metro wanted to disassemble the road and re-assemble it elsewhere, while the City Council wanted Attiko Metro to redesign its network to accommodate the discovery in situ.

Venizelou station will also feature an open archaeological site, the first of its kind anywhere in a metro station, in order to maintain the road in its original location. At the next station, where the same road was unearthed (and where it is arguably more important, as a public square was found as well), the road will be disassembled and reassembled elsewhere.

Venizelou station also appears in the 1988 Thessaloniki Metro proposal under the name Alkazar. Alkazar is the popular name for Hamza Bey Mosque, a landmark on Egnatia and Venizelou streets.

References

See also
List of Thessaloniki Metro stations

Thessaloniki Metro